Margarita is a genus of sea snails, marine gastropod mollusks in the family Margaritidae.

The name of this genus has become invalid as  junior homonym of Margarita Leach, 1814 [Bivalvia, Pteriidae], a synonym of Pinctada Röding, 1798. The accepted name is Margarites Gray, 1847

Species
Species brought into synonymy 
 Margarita actinophora Dall, 1890 : synonym of Calliotropis actinophora (Dall, 1890)
 Margarita angulata A. Adams, 1853 : synonym of Peasiella tantilla (Gould, 1849)
 Margarita cumingii A. Adams, 1851: synonym of Broderipia cumingii A. Adams, 1851 
 Margarita expansa G.B. Sowerby I, 1838: synonym of Photinula expansa (G.B. Sowerby I, 1838)
 Margarita imperialis Dall, 1881: synonym of Lischkeia imperialis (Dall, 1881)
 Margarita infundibulum  : synonym of Calliotropis infundibulum (Watson, 1879)
 Margarita lissocona Dall, 1881: synonym of Calliotropis lissocona (Dall, 1881)
 Margarita marmoreus Pease, 1861: synonym of Calliotrochus marmoreus (Pease, 1861)
 Margarita ponsonbyi Preston, 1908: synonym of Calliotrochus marmoreus (Pease, 1861)
 Margarita regalis Verrill & S. Smith, 1880: synonym of Calliotropis regalis (Verrill & Smith, 1880)
 Margarita striatula (Garrett, 1857): synonym of Calliotrochus marmoreus (Pease, 1861)
 Margarita subantarctica Strebel, 1908: synonym of Margarella subantarctica (Strebel, 1908)
 Margarita tasmanica Tenison-Woods, 1877: synonym of  Truncatella scalarina Cox, 1867
 Margarita undulata G.B. Sowerby I, 1838: synonym of Margarites undulata (G.B. Sowerby, I, 1838)

Species inquirenda
 Margarita carinata A. Adams, 1853 
 Margarita ianthina Gould, 1861 
 Margarita lacazei var. nigricans Vélain, 1877
 Margarita lenticula Gould, 1861 
 Margarita maxima G. B. Sowerby II, 1878 (use in recent literature currently undocumented)
 Margarita persica Gould, 1852 
 Margarita pulchella Reeve, 1848 
 Margarita pulcherrima G. B. Sowerby II, 1878 (use in recent literature currently undocumented)
 Margarita sigaretina G. B. Sowerby I, 1838 (use in recent literature currently undocumented)
 Margarita tessellata A. Adams, 1853 
 Margarita variabilis A. Adams, 1853 
 Margarita vulgaris G. B. Sowerby I, 1838 (use in recent literature currently undocumented)

References

Turbinidae